Milan Brzý (born 7 May 1969) is a Czech former ice dancer. Early in his career, he competed for Czechoslovakia with Ivana Střondalová, placing in the top ten at the 1990 European Championships and winning the bronze medal at the 1991 Winter Universiade. Brzý teamed up with Radmila Chroboková around 1992. They represented the Czech Republic at the 1994 Winter Olympics, finishing 16th.  

Brzý studied at the Silesian University, obtaining a Master's degree in January 2001. He married a former synchronized skater, Monika Brzá, and became a coach in Frýdek-Místek.

Competitive highlights

With Chroboková for the Czech Republic

With Střondalová for Czechoslovakia

References 

1969 births
Czech male ice dancers
Czechoslovak male ice dancers
Living people
Sportspeople from Karviná
Figure skaters at the 1994 Winter Olympics
Olympic figure skaters of the Czech Republic
Universiade medalists in figure skating
Universiade bronze medalists for Czechoslovakia
Competitors at the 1991 Winter Universiade